The Brexit 50p coin is a commemorative 50p coin that was struck to mark the planned exit of the United Kingdom from the European Union ("Brexit") on 31 October 2019. The minting of the Brexit coin was ordered by Sajid Javid. A total of 10 million Brexit coins, each stamped with the date 31 October 2019, were planned to be minted. In late October 2019, with increasing doubts that Brexit would actually happen on that date, the minting of the coins was "paused".

In late October 2019 it was announced that the coins would be recycled as the UK would not leave the EU on 31 October 2019. A Treasury spokesman said that a coin to mark Brexit will still be produced but that it would enter circulation after the UK has left the EU.

The coin is inscribed with a quote from Thomas Jefferson on it. This has proved controversial for non-Brexit-related reasons, such as the lack of an Oxford comma, and because Jefferson owned slaves and fathered children with Sally Hemings, a woman enslaved to him, only freeing their children upon his death.

Relaunch
In December 2019 a new Brexit 50p coin was announced after the Conservative Party victory in the general election. Gold and silver versions of the coins were announced for collectors. In January 2020 Downing Street announced that the coins would start entering circulation on 31 January 2020.

References

External links 
 Your guide to the Brexit 50p coin at www.allaboutcoins.co.uk

Brexit
Commemorative coins
2019 in British politics
Coins of the United Kingdom
Fifty-cent coins